Jeff Jacques may refer to:

 Jeph Jacques (born 1980), writes and illustrates the webcomic Questionable Content
 Jeff Jacques (ice hockey) (born 1953), ice hockey player